Roman Pavlyk (born 1 December 1983) is a Paralympic athlete from Ukraine. He has cerebral palsy and competes in T36 sprint and F36 long jump events.

He competed in the 2008 Summer Paralympics in Beijing, China. There he won a gold medal in the men's  - T36 event, a gold medal in the men's  - T36 event and a silver medal in the men's  - T36 event. At the 2012 Summer Paralympics he won gold medals in long jump and 200 metres events, and bronze in 100 m and 400 m races.

He holds the long jump world record for F36 classified athletes.

References

External links
 

1983 births
Living people
Paralympic athletes of Ukraine
Athletes (track and field) at the 2008 Summer Paralympics
Athletes (track and field) at the 2012 Summer Paralympics
Paralympic gold medalists for Ukraine
Paralympic silver medalists for Ukraine
Paralympic bronze medalists for Ukraine
World record holders in Paralympic athletics
Medalists at the 2008 Summer Paralympics
Medalists at the 2012 Summer Paralympics
Ukrainian male sprinters
Ukrainian male long jumpers
Medalists at the World Para Athletics Championships
Medalists at the World Para Athletics European Championships
Paralympic medalists in athletics (track and field)
Athletes (track and field) at the 2020 Summer Paralympics